The 2022 Norfolk State Spartans football team represented Norfolk State University as a member of the Mid-Eastern Athletic Conference (MEAC) during the 2022 NCAA Division I FCS football season. The Spartans, led by second-year head coach Dawson Odums, played their home games at William "Dick" Price Stadium.

Previous season

The Spartans finished the 2021 season with a record of 6–5, 2–3 MEAC play to finish in a tie for third place.

Schedule

Game summaries

at Marshall

at James Madison

Hampton

Saint Francis (PA)

at Sacred Heart

at Morgan State

Delaware State

Howard

at North Carolina A&T

North Carolina Central

at South Carolina State

References

Norfolk State
Norfolk State Spartans football seasons
Norfolk State Spartans football